Kiga may refer to:
the Kiga people of Rwanda and Uganda
the Kiga language
Kiga, Iran, a village in Tehran Province
 Kiga Station, a train station in Japan

See also 
 Kigga, a village in India